The 1923 Pacific Tigers football team represented the College of the Pacific—now known as the University of the Pacific—in Stockton, California as a member of the California Coast Conference (CCC) during the 1923 college football season. The team was led by third-year head coach Erwin Righter and played home games at a field on campus in Stockton. Pacific compiled an overall record of 7–0 with a conference mark of 4–0. The Tigers dominated their opponents, outscoring them 171–12 for the season, and had five shutouts in the seven games.

At the end of the season, Pacific, as the champion of the CCC North Division was to meet the champion of the CCC South Division, Fresno State, for the conference championship. However, the two teams could not agree on a site and the game was never played.

Schedule

Notes

References

Pacific
Pacific Tigers football seasons
College football undefeated seasons
California Coast Conference football champion seasons
Pacific Tigers football